Spring Revolution or Spring protests may refer to:

Spring of Nations, Revolutions of 1848
Prague Spring, 1968 protest in the Czechoslovak Socialist Republic
Croatian Spring, 1971 protests
2009 Iranian presidential election protests, or Persian Spring
Arab Spring, early 2010s protests 
Turkish Spring, 2013 Gezi Park protests
Ukrainian Spring, or Euromaidan, 2013–2014 demonstrations and civil unrest in Ukraine
Bosnian Spring, 2014 unrest in Bosnia and Herzegovina
Venezuelan Spring, protests since 2014
2021 Myanmar protests, known locally as the Spring Revolution